Zachary Douglas Filkins (born September 15, 1978) is an American musician, actor and songwriter. He is a guitarist for the pop rock band OneRepublic.

Biography

Early life
A significant part of Filkins's childhood was spent intensely studying classical guitar in Barcelona, Spain. He attended Colorado Springs Christian High School in Colorado Springs, Colorado, where he played for the school soccer team. It was at the high school that he met future bandmate Ryan Tedder during their senior year. During a drive home, Filkins and Tedder were discussing their favorite musicians and decided to form a band. They began performing in a group called 'This Beautiful Mess' with some of their friends, playing small gigs attended by friends and family. After the end of their senior year, Tedder and Filkins parted ways, each attending different colleges.

Personal life
In 2010, Filkins and his wife, Lindsay, had a son. He openly thanked and acknowledged her in the liner notes of OneRepublic's debut album, Dreaming Out Loud. Filkins speaks Spanish fluently.

Career

Modeling

Before moving to Los Angeles and starting OneRepublic, Filkins did some modeling on the side in Chicago. He worked under Maximum Talent Agency and was featured in a few brands ads such as on Covington and Jockey Underwear. His torso image can still be seen on some packages of Jockey Underwear.

OneRepublic
Filkins plays guitar, viola and sings background vocals for the band. In addition to guitar and background vocals, he also aids friend and co-founder, Ryan Tedder, in writing and composing music for the band. Filkins shares writing and composing credits on the songs "All Fall Down", "Prodigal", "Say (All I Need)", "Sleep", "Something's Not Right Here", "Stop and Stare", "Tyrant" and "Won't Stop".

Formation
In 2002, Filkins got a call from Tedder asking him if he still wanted to put together a band. Tedder convinced Filkins to move to Los Angeles from Chicago. After a few line-up changes the band solidified with Tedder on keyboards and lead vocals, Filkins and Drew Brown on guitar, Brent Kutzle on bass and cello and Eddie Fisher on drums and percussion. After only nine months in Los Angeles they were signed to Columbia Records and recorded a full album, which took two years. Two months before the album was set to be released, they were dropped from the label. As soon as they were dropped, the band's MySpace profile took off and they soon became the number one unsigned act in the social networking site. A number of labels offered them a record deal including Interscope Records. Although hesitant to go under another major record label the band signed to Interscope under Timbaland's Mosley Music Group, as its first rock band.

Filkins was also a judge for the 10th and 11th annual The Independent Music Awards to support independent artists' careers.

Other
Filkins guest-starred as a forest ranger in the hit crime series Criminal Minds, Season 7 episode 6, titled "Epilogue".

References

External links
Zach Filkins' portfolio at MaxTalent.com

1978 births
Living people
OneRepublic members
Guitarists from Colorado
OneRepublic